Supercrawl is an annual art and indie music festival held each September in downtown Hamilton, Ontario.

History
Supercrawl was founded in 2009, in the spirit of the monthly event known as Art Crawl, a walking tour of art galleries in Hamilton that is still active.

In June 2020, festival organizers announced that they would be reconfiguring festival programming in response to logistical uncertainties around coronavirus impacts, with smaller-scale events taking place in late 2020 and early 2021, and the free festival taking place the second weekend in September, 2021.

Overview
Supercrawl features three days of free music spread over multiple stages lining the length of James Street North. The festival attracts over 200,000 visitors annually to watch over 50 bands, making it one of the largest free music festivals in Ontario. Supercrawl's stages showcase a spectrum of musical styles, from pop, indie rock, electronic, soul, R&B and hip-hop, to funk, folk, blues, jazz, and orchestral.

Supercrawl also showcases large-scale visual art installations, independent fashion, street theatre, performance art, dance, an authors' tent, an artisan market and food trucks.

The arts festival has been cited as part of a larger, arts-based revival in Hamilton as the former industrial city becomes a regional center for the arts.

In 2015, Supercrawl was named Ontario's Tourism Event of the Year as part of the Ontario Tourism Awards of Excellence and was a finalist for Ontario's Tourism Event of the Year in 2019. The festival also received a 2017 nomination for the Metro Toronto Convention Centre Event Of The Year from the Canadian Tourism Awards.

In 2015, the organizers of Supercrawl Productions began to expand into one-off events at other times of the year, under the billing Supercrawl Presents.

References

External links
 Supercrawl

Festivals in Hamilton, Ontario
Summer festivals
Recurring events established in 1976
Music festivals in Ontario